James Anthony Hughes (February 27, 1861March 2, 1930) was a member of the United States House of Representatives from the state of West Virginia.

Hughes was born near Corunna in the Province of Canada (in what is now Ontario). He immigrated to the United States as a youth, graduating from business school in Pittsburgh, Pennsylvania in 1875. He worked as a bank messenger, travelling salesman, and a businessman before being elected to the Kentucky House of Representatives in 1888, serving a two-year term. He was a member of the West Virginia Senate from 1894 to 1898. In 1896, Hughes was appointed postmaster of Huntington, West Virginia. He was a delegate to every Republican National Convention from 1892 to 1924.

In 1900, Hughes was elected as a Republican to the U.S. House of Representatives in the 4th congressional district. After his first term, he represented West Virginia's 5th, and was elected six additional times before choosing not to run again in 1914. During his time as a Representative, he served as chair of the Committee on Expenditures on Public Buildings and as chair of the Committee on Accounts. After eleven years of retirement he was re-elected to the House in 1926 for the 4th congressional district. He served two terms before dying in office on March 2, 1930, in Marion, Ohio. He was interred in Spring Hill Cemetery in Huntington.

Hughes was, through his marriage to Belle Vinson, a member of the Vinson political family.  His daughter, Eloise Hughes Smith, was among the survivors of the RMS Titanic disaster. Her husband, Lucien P. Smith, died in the sinking. She later married another Titanic survivor, Robert Daniel.

See also
List of United States Congress members who died in office (1900–49)

References

Canadian emigrants to the United States
Hughes, James A.
Hughes, James A.
Politicians from Huntington, West Virginia
People from Lambton County
1861 births
1930 deaths
Republican Party members of the United States House of Representatives from West Virginia
Burials at Spring Hill Cemetery (Huntington, West Virginia)
West Virginia Republicans